Inge Hornstra (born 21 May 1974) is an Australian-born stage and television actress.  She is best known for her roles on Heartbreak High and McLeod's Daughters.

Early life
Hornstra was born in 1974 in Sydney, Australia to Dutch parents. She graduated from NIDA with a degree in Performing Arts in 1994.

Career
Hornstra began her acting career in 1993, appearing in a short film titled The Door.  She gained recognition for her leading role as 'Tatyana 'Tats' Alecsandri' in Sweat, a drama series set in an athletic school.  It also starred Heath Ledger in his first leading role in a television series. The show was cancelled after just one season due to low ratings.  Following Sweat, Hornstra had a recurring role as 'Allie Matts' on teen television series Heartbreak High for two seasons.  From 2002 to 2006, Hornstra had a recurring role on popular series McLeod's Daughters, as 'Sandra Kinsella' (later Kinsella-Ryan). Other credits include medical drama series G.P., Big Sky, Murder Call, Wildside, Water Rats, Head Start, BeastMaster, and Farscape; and the television films Chameleon, which aired on UPN in 1998, BlackJack: Murder Archive and BlackJack: Ace Point Game.

Personal life
Hornstra has two children, a daughter, Summer (born 12 July 2004) and a son, Javi (born 2008).

Filmography

References

External links

1974 births
Living people
Dutch emigrants to Australia
National Institute of Dramatic Art alumni
Australian stage actresses
Australian television actresses